The CUNY Academic Commons is an online, academic social network for community members of the City University of New York (CUNY) system. Designed to foster conversation, collaboration, and connections among the 24 individual colleges that make up the university system, the site, founded in 2009, has quickly grown as a hub for the CUNY community, serving in the process to strengthen a growing group of digital scholars, teachers, and open-source projects at the university.

As stated in the site's Terms of Service, members "seek to use the Academic Commons as a means of fulfilling our highest aspirations for integrating technology into our teaching, learning, and collaborating."

Information silos vs. shareable knowledge 
 In their case study of the CUNY Academic Commons, published in On the Horizon, Gold & Otte (2011) note that, prior to the CUNY Academic Commons, little "cross-campus communication" between like-minded faculty and graduate students existed. CUNY was a "loose federation" of campuses, largely represented by static websites. The need for a university-wide means of sharing knowledge was perceived by CUNY Committee on Academic Technology, and discussions began in early 2008 to find a solution.

Nantel (2010), Kaya (2010), and others have similarly observed how information can easily get stuck in institutional "silos". Social networks, like the CUNY Academic Commons, can "help open communications between departments" and improve knowledge transfer (Nantel). While countering the "prospect of missed connections" was a principal reason why the CUNY Academic Commons was formed, serendipitous discovery became a technological goal. Developers of the site (primarily faculty and graduate students) experimented with social media tools to see how best to connect scholars, while not being too intrusive in their daily lives.

Background 
Work began in 2008 to create a repository of "learning objects" which could be easily shared and archived, and which were designed to constantly evolve. The Committee on Academic Technology reached out to the various campuses for ideas, and feedback indicated that the site should be "open and organic" and flexible enough to respond to the diverse needs of the faculty. The first beta version of the site was created in February, 2009, and after much tinkering, CUNY Academic Commons was officially launched in December of the same year.  The site has seen "rapid adoption". Membership as of May 2011 was nearly 2000, while the number of blogs on the site was close to 400. By 2017, even after deleting inactive users, membership was estimated at 7900. In 2017, undergraduates were allowed to join and by 2022, membership skyrocketed to over 40,000.

From the very beginning, the site was a "space of open experimentation, open communication, and open sharing."  A participatory network encourages "peer-to-peer learning among faculty members" and is "a generative platform" which makes "the professoriate of the largest urban public university system in the world more visible to itself and to a wider public," according to Gold & Otte.

In her critique in Yale University’s Collaborative Learning Center blog, Kristjiana Gong (2010) finds several ways CUNY Academic Commons is able to build a "social university":
transparency in development and support
porous boundaries between users and support at all levels
regular communication
users are engaged in creating a warmer community

Since funding did not permit a full-service site, a small team of software developers and community facilitators began to shape the Commons with a "self-service approach" in which faculty and graduate students were largely responsible for building their own sites. An open-source model was adopted in which the community as a whole was responsible for testing, defect reporting, and ideas for enhancements.

For a comprehensive history of the Commons, see the timeline "From The Beginning: A Commons Retrospective.".

The CUNY Academic Commons has a strong ethos of giving back to the WordPress and BuddyPress community.  Writing for WPMU.org, Siobhan Ambrose (2011) notes that the site has released many significant BuddyPress plug-ins and regularly shares tips and hacks with the BuddyPress network.

A Pedagogical Hub 
The CUNY Academic Commons been expanded over time to incorporate more robust group and site functionality, and it has become both a hub for sharing pedagological resources and a tool for teaching courses. Although the site was originally open to only faculty, administration, staff, and graduate students,  in 2017 the site was opened to undergraduate students and experienced significant growth. Faculty use the platform as an open-source supplement to the university's licensed closed-source Blackboard system. 

While popular LMS systems such as Blackboard aim to provide academic course spaces for individual courses within institutions, the Commons is designed to facilitate conversation and collaboration among colleagues both within and between colleges in the system. Because of its do-it-yourself, open-source approach to scholarly communication, the Commons has sometimes been characterized as an alternative to LMS systems. But it is not and never will be an LMS. It has no grading system nor does it connect to the CUNY First, the university's student portal. 

CUNY teaching projects that share the technical architecture, open source ethos, and DIY approach of the Commons include Blogs@Baruch and Eportfolios@Macaulay, and Looking for Whitman.

Facebook comparisons 
Many reviews in the current literature point out similarities between the CUNY Academic Commons and Facebook. But as Kaya (2010) contends in the Chronicle of Higher Education, Facebook does not offer the kind of academic interaction that is available with sites such as the CUNY Academic Commons which "mix serious academic work, and connections among working scholars." Indeed, the CUNY Academic Commons emphasizes the "productivity oriented features of social networking" and "collaborative academic work" (Gold & Otte) that is not generally found in commercial social networks. As Gold (2011) writes in "Beyond Friending: BuddyPress and the Social, Networked, Open-Source Classroom" that students are often reluctant to mix social networks with academic networks. Faculty too, it may be inferred, value distinct, professional networks where they can focus on their scholarship.

Open source technical infrastructure 
CUNY Academic Commons is built entirely with open source software: WordPress with Multisite and BuddyPress. It uses MYSQL as a database and runs under Linux. BuddyPress, a powerful WordPress plug-in which transforms a multi-user WordPress site into a social network, serves as the site's hub. Users are allowed to create as many blogs and groups as they want. As Lamb & Groom (2011) write in Educause: "the jaw-dropping CUNY Academic Commons … seamlessly integrates the open-source … platforms into an appealing and highly sustainable environment."

Grants and awards

Commons in a Box 
In November, 2011, the CUNY Academic Commons received a $107,500 grant from the Alfred P. Sloan Foundation to create Commons in a Box, a "new open-source project that will help other organizations quickly and easily install and customize their own Commons platforms". Writing in the Chronicle of Higher Education, Jennifer Howard notes that the CUNY Academic Commons will first "work with the Modern Language Association on a pilot project to create an 'MLA Commons' for its more than 30,000 members" to help promote their scholarship.

Sloan-C Award For Effective Practice 
At their 5th Annual International Symposium for Emerging Technologies for Online Learning on July 25–27, 2012, the Sloan Consortium presented an award to the CUNY Academic Commons for effective practices in online and blended education. "The CUNY Academic Commons: Social Network as Hatchery" was one of six winning practices recognized for a number of criteria, including "innovation and replicability" and the ability to advance “the goals of access, learning effectiveness, faculty and student satisfaction, and scalability.”

What members build 

The tag line from the site's brochure - "What will you build?" is a good introduction to the diverse materials posted on the CUNY Academic Commons. The following links provide examples of what is available on the site:

Personal blogs 
Helldriver's Pit Stop
Turf Walls
Tony's Thoughts
RuthOBrien.org

Group blogs 
CUNY Hybrid Initiative: Established in November 2012 as an open resource to help faculty, instructional designers, and administrators in creating, teaching, and supporting hybrid courses.
A Living Laboratory: General Education Seminars at City Tech
Queens College Graduate School of Library and Information Studies
Open Access at CUNY
CUNY Pie – A Pizza blog for CUNY Geeks

Groups and forums 
E-Books in the Libraries
Math Matters
e-Portfolios
New Media Lab
Creative Commons and Copyright: Resources for the Teaching Faculty

Program Community Pages 
Philosophy
Anthropology
Graduate Center Music Program Community Portal
Urban Education Graduate Commons

See also 

WordPress
BuddyPress
MediaWiki

Sources and further reading 
Kaya, T. (2010). "CUNY Social Network Mixes Scholarship With Facebook-Style Friendship." Chronicle of Higher Education. Retrieved from http://chronicle.com/blogs/wiredcampus/cuny-social-network-mixes-scholarship-with-facebook-style-friendship/27266
Parry. (2010). "WordPress a Better LMS." Chronicle of Higher Education. Retrieved from http://chronicle.com/blogs/profhacker/wordpress-a-better-lms/23050
Degl'innocenti, J. (2010, December 20). "The 20 Most Outstanding BuddyPress sites of 2010." Retrieved March 25, 2011, from https://web.archive.org/web/20110805140057/http://buddydress.com/2010/12/the-20-most-outstanding-buddypress-sites-of-2010-by-jerome-degl%E2%80%99innocenti
Kaya, T. (2010). "New College Social Networks, Unlike Facebook, Foster Academic Interaction." Chronicle of Higher Education. Retrieved from http://chronicle.com/article/New-College-Networks-Unlike/124871/
Nantel, R. (2010, October 1). "Internal Social Networks May Help Break Down Institutional Silos." Retrieved March 21, 2011, from http://www.brandon-hall.com/workplacelearningtoday/?p=12348
Lamb, B., & Groom, J. (2010). "Never Mind the Edupunks; or, The Great Web 2.0 Swindle" EDUCAUSE. July/August 2010, 45(4), 50–58. Retrieved from https://web.archive.org/web/20110406075133/http://www.educause.edu/EDUCAUSE+Review/EDUCAUSEReviewMagazineVolume45/NeverMindtheEdupunksorTheGreat/209326
Gold, M. (2011). "Beyond Friending: BuddyPress and the Social, Networked, Open-Source Classroom." Learning Through Digital Media Experiments in Technology and Pedagogy. Retrieved from https://web.archive.org/web/20110621111244/http://learningthroughdigitalmedia.net/beyond-friending-buddypress-and-the-social-networked-open-source-classroom
Gold, M. (2011). "The CUNY Academic Commons announces the Commons in a Box project." Academic Commons News. Retrieved August 4, 2012, from http://news.commons.gc.cuny.edu/2011/11/22/the-cuny-academic-commons-announces-the-commons-in-a-box-project/
 
Gong, K. (2011, March 2). "The CUNY Academic Commons: Building the Social University." Collaborative Learning Center, Yale University. Retrieved March 19, 2011, from http://clc.yale.edu/2011/03/02/the-cuny-academic-commons-building-the-social-university/
Ambrose, S. (2011, February 22). "15 Go-To Places for WordPress and BuddyPress News, Tips and Tutorials." WordPress News at WPMU.org. Retrieved June 8, 2011, from https://web.archive.org/web/20110723021140/http://wpmu.org/15-go-to-places-for-wordpress-and-buddypress-news-tips-and-tutorials/
Roel, R. (2010, April 1). "A Facebook for Faculty." CUNY Matters. April 2010. Retrieved June 8, 2011, from http://www.cuny.edu/news/publications/cunymatters/april2010/facebook-for-faculty.html
 
Jones, K. & Farrington, P. (2012). "Learning from Libraries Using WordPress: Content-Management System Best Practices and Case Studies." ALA Editions. [Forthcoming] Retrieved June 8, 2011 from http://www.alatechsource.org/taxonomy/term/106/using-wordpress-as-a-library-content-management-system
Howard, J. (2011). "Creating new academic networks with 'Commons in a Box'." Chronicle of Higher Education. Retrieved August 5, 2012 from http://chronicle.com/blogs/wiredcampus/creating-new-academic-networks-with-commons-in-a-box/34453

References

External links 
CUNY Academic Commons (official site)
CUNY Academic Commons on Twitter
Commons In A Box open source release of CUNY Academic Commons
Philosophy Commons

City University of New York
Education in New York City
American social networking websites
Public commons
Community building
Community development